This is a list of individual opera composers and their major works.

The list includes composers' principal operas and those of historical importance in the development of the art form. It covers the full historical period from the birth of opera in the late 16th century to the present day, and includes all forms of opera from light music to more formal styles.

List of operas by composer's last name

A
Michel van der Aa (1970– ): After Life, One
Ludwig Abeille (1761–1838): Amor und Psyche, Peter und Ännchen
Paul Abraham (1892–1960): Ball im Savoy, Die Blume von Hawaii, Viki, Viktoria und ihr Husar
Adolphe Adam (1803–1856): Le chalet, Le postillon de Lonjumeau, La poupée de Nuremberg, Si j'étais roi, Le toréador
Mark Adamo (1962– ): Little Women, Lysistrata
John Adams (1947– ): The Death of Klinghoffer, Doctor Atomic, A Flowering Tree, El Niño, I Was Looking at the Ceiling and Then I Saw the Sky, Nixon in China
Thomas Adès (1971– ): Powder Her Face, The Tempest, The Exterminating Angel
Samuel Adler (1928– ): The Disappointment
Isaac Albéniz (1860–1909): Henry Clifford, Pepita Jiménez, Merlin
Eugen d'Albert (1864–1932): Flauto solo, Tiefland, Die toten Augen
Tomaso Albinoni (1671–1750): Artamene, Didone abbandonata, Il tiranno eroe, La Statira, Zenobia
Franco Alfano (1875–1954): Cyrano de Bergerac, Risurrezione, Sakùntala
Francisco António de Almeida (c.1702–?1755): La Spinalba
William Alwyn (1905–1985): Miss Julie
Garland Anderson (1933–2001): Soyazhe
Johann André (1741–1799): Erwin und Elmire, Der Töpfer
Mark Andre (1964– ): Wunderzaichen
Hendrik Andriessen (1892–1981): Philomela, De Spiegel uit Venetië
Louis Andriessen (1939– ): Rosa – A Horse Drama, Writing to Vermeer, La Commedia
Pasquale Anfossi (1727–1797): L'avaro, Il curioso indiscreto, La vera costanza
Anna Amalia of Brunswick-Wolfenbüttel (1739–1807): Erwin und Elmire
George Antheil (1900–1959): Transatlantic, Helen Retires, Volpone
Francesco Araja (1709–c. 1770): Tsefal i Prokris
Anton Arensky (1861–1906): Dream on the Volga
Dominick Argento (1927– ): Casanova's Homecoming, Christopher Sly, Postcard from Morocco
Thomas Arne (1710–1778): Alfred, Artaxerxes, Comus, The Cooper, Eliza, The Fairy Prince, Love in a Village, Rosamond, Thomas and Sally
Samuel Arnold (1740–1802): The Baron Kinkvervankotsdorsprakingatchdern, Inkle and Yarico
Leo Ascher (1880–1942): Hoheit tanzt Walzer
Daniel Auber (1782–1871): Le cheval de bronze, Les diamants de la couronne, Le domino noir, Fra Diavolo, Gustave III, Haydée, Manon Lescaut, La muette de Portici, La part du diable
Edmond Audran (1842–1901): La mascotte, Les noces d'Olivette
Svitlana Azarova (1976– ): Momo og tidstyvene

B
Grażyna Bacewicz (1909–1969): The Adventure of King Arthur
Johann Christian Bach (1735–1782): Temistocle, Amadis de Gaule
Michael William Balfe (1808–1870): The Bohemian Girl, The Maid of Artois, The Rose of Castille, L'étoile de Seville, The Siege of Rochelle
Granville Bantock (1868–1946): The Seal Woman
Samuel Barber (1910–1981): Antony and Cleopatra, A Hand of Bridge, Vanessa
Francisco A. Barbieri (1823–1894): Jugar con fuego, Los diamantes de la corona, El barberillo de Lavapiés
John Barnett (1802–1890): Mountain Sylph, Fair Rosamond, Farinelli
Gerald Barry (1952– ): The Bitter Tears of Petra von Kant, The Importance of Being Earnest
Jiří Bárta (1935–2012): Čitra (Chitra)
Béla Bartók (1881–1945): Bluebeard's Castle
Jan Zdeněk Bartoš (1908–1981): Prokletý zámek (The Cursed Mansion)
Franco Battiato (1945–2021): Genesi, Gilgamesh, Messa arcaica, Il cavaliere dell'intelletto
Amy Beach (1867–1944): Cabildo
Jack Beeson (1921–2010): Captain Jinks of the Horse Marines, Hello Out There, Lizzie Borden, The Sweet Bye and Bye
Ludwig van Beethoven (1770–1827): Fidelio
 Ján Levoslav Bella (1843–1936): Wieland der Schmied
Vincenzo Bellini (1801–1835): Adelson e Salvini, Beatrice di Tenda, Bianca e Fernando (Bianca e Gernando), I Capuleti e i Montecchi, Norma, Il pirata, I puritani, La sonnambula, La straniera, Zaira
Ralph Benatzky (1884–1957): Bezauberndes Fräulein, Meine Schwester und ich, The White Horse Inn (Im weißen Rößl)
Georg Benda (1722–1795): Ariadne auf Naxos, Medea, Pygmalion, Romeo und Julie, Walder
Julius Benedict (1804–1885): The Lily of Killarney
Arthur Benjamin (1893–1960): The Devil Take Her
George Benjamin (composer) (1960– ): Written on Skin, Lessons in Love and Violence
Tim Benjamin (1975– ): The Corley Conspiracy
Richard Rodney Bennett (1936–2012): The Mines of Sulphur
Maksym Berezovsky (1745–1777): Demofonte
Alban Berg (1885–1935): Lulu, Wozzeck
Erik Bergman (1911–2006): The Singing Tree
Luciano Berio (1925–2003): Opera, La vera storia, Un re in ascolto, Outis, Cronaca del luogo
Lennox Berkeley (1903–1989): Nelson, Ruth
Michael Berkeley (1948– ): Baa, Baa, Black Sheep, For You, Jane Eyre
Hector Berlioz (1803–1869): Béatrice et Bénédict, Benvenuto Cellini, La damnation de Faust, Les francs-juges, Les Troyens
Leonard Bernstein (1918–1990): Candide, A Quiet Place, Trouble in Tahiti, West Side Story
Louise Bertin (1805–1877): La Esmeralda
Franz Berwald (1796–1868): The Queen of Golconda, Estrella de Soria, I enter a monastery, The Modiste
Oscar Bianchi (1975– ): Thanks to My Eyes
Francesco Bianchi (1752–1810): Alonso e Cora, Arbace, Calto, Castore e Polluce, La morte di Cesare, Seleuco, re di Siria, La villanella rapita, Zemira
Harrison Birtwistle (1934–2022): Gawain, The Io Passion, The Last Supper, The Mask of Orpheus, The Minotaur, The Second Mrs Kong, Punch and Judy, Yan Tan Tethera
Georges Bizet (1838–1875): Carmen, Djamileh, Le docteur Miracle, Don Procopio, Ivan IV, La jolie fille de Perth, La maison du docteur, Les pêcheurs de perles
Terence Blanchard (1962– ): Champion, Fire Shut Up in My Bones
Arthur Bliss (1891–1975): The Olympians, Tobias and the Angel
Marc Blitzstein (1905–1964): Regina
Ernest Bloch (1880–1959): Macbeth
Vilém Blodek (1834–1874): In the Well (V studni)
Karl-Birger Blomdahl (1916–1968): Aniara
John Blow (1649–1708): Venus and Adonis
Luigi Boccherini (1743–1805): Clementina
Philippe Boesmans (1936– ): Julie, La passion de Gilles, Reigen, Wintermärchen
Craig Bohmler (1956– ): Riders of the Purple Sage
François-Adrien Boieldieu (1775–1834): Le calife de Bagdad, La dame blanche
Joseph Bodin de Boismortier (1689–1755): Don Quichotte chez la Duchesse
Arrigo Boito (1842–1918): Mefistofele, Nerone
William Bolcom (1938– ): A View from the Bridge, A Wedding, McTeague
Joseph Bologne (1745–1799): L'amant anonyme
Antonio Maria Bononcini (1677–1726): Griselda
Giovanni Bononcini (1670–1747): Muzio Scevola, Xerse, Griselda, Almahide, Camilla
Alexander Borodin (1833–1887): Prince Igor (Knyaz Igor)
Rutland Boughton (1878–1960): The Immortal Hour
Antonio Braga (1929– ): 1492 epopea lirica d'America, San Domenico di Guzman
Walter Braunfels (1882–1954): Prinzessin Brambilla, Verkündigung, Die Vögel
Eef van Breen (1978– ): ’u’
Nicolae Bretan (1887–1968): Arald, Golem, Horia, Luceafarul
Tomás Bretón (1850–1923): La verbena de la Paloma, La Dolores
Benjamin Britten (1913–1976): Albert Herring, Billy Budd, The Burning Fiery Furnace, Curlew River, Death in Venice, Gloriana, The Little Sweep, A Midsummer Night's Dream, Noye's Fludde, Owen Wingrave, Paul Bunyan, Peter Grimes, The Prodigal Son, The Rape of Lucretia, The Turn of the Screw
Rudolf Brucci (1917–2002): Gilgamesh
Max Bruch (1838–1920): Die Loreley
Arthur Bruhns (1874–1928): Ib and Little Christina
Ignaz Brüll (1846–1907): Das goldene Kreuz
Alfred Bruneau (1857–1934): Angelo, L'attaque du moulin, L'enfant roi, Messidor, L'ouragan, La rêve
Joanna Bruzdowicz (1943– ): The Penal Colony, The Women of Troy, The Gates of Paradise
Mark Bucci (1924–2002): Tale for a Deaf Ear
August Bungert (1845–1915): Die Odyssee
Anthony Burgess (1917–1993): Blooms of Dublin
Paul Burkhard (1911–1977): Feuerwerk (Der schwarze Hecht), Hopsa
Keith Burstein (1957– ): Manifest Destiny
Alan Bush (1900–1995): Men of Blackmoor, Wat Tyler, Joe Hill
Ferruccio Busoni (1866–1924): Arlecchino, Die Brautwahl, Doktor Faust, Turandot
Sylvano Bussotti (1931–2021): La Passion selon Sade, Le Racine

C
Francesca Caccini (1587–1630/1640): La liberazione di Ruggiero
Giulio Caccini (1551–1618): Euridice, Il rapimento di Cefalo
John Cage (1912–1992): Europeras
Robert Cambert (c.1627–1677): Pomone
André Campra (1660–1744): Alcine, Les âges, Le carnaval de Venise, L'Europe galante, Les fêtes vénitiennes, Hésione, Idoménée, Iphigénie en Tauride, Tancrède
Michele Carafa (1787–1872): La belle au bois dormant
David Carlson (1952– ): The Midnight Angel, Anna Karenina
Frank Osmond Carr (1858–1916): His Excellency
Pavlos Carrer (1829–1896): Dante e Bice, Isabella d'Aspeno, La Rediviva, Marcos Botsaris, Fior di Maria, I Kyra Frossyni, Maria Antonietta, Despo, Marathon – Salamis
Elliott Carter (1908–2012): What Next?
Alfredo Catalani (1854–1893): Loreley, La Wally
Daniel Catán (1949–2011): Rappaccini's Daughter, Florencia en el Amazonas, Salsipuedes
Eduard Caudella (1841–1924): Commandant Baltag, Petru Rareş
Emilio de' Cavalieri (c. 1550–1602): Rappresentatione di Anima, et di Corpo
Francesco Cavalli (1602–1676): Gli amori d'Apollo e di Dafne, Artemisia, Calisto, Ciro, Coriolano, Didone, Doriclea, Egisto, Elena, Eliogabalo, Ercole amante, Erismena, Eritrea, Giasone, Hipermestra, Orimonte, Orione, Oristeo, Ormindo, Mutio Scevola, Le nozze di Teti e di Peleo, Pompeo Magno, Rosinda, Scipione affricano, Statira principessa di Persia, Veremonda, La virtù dei strali d'Amore, Xerse
Ludvík Čelanský (1870–1931): Kamilla
Alfred Cellier (1844–1891): After All!, The Carp, Dora's Dream, Doris, Dorothy, In the Sulks, The Mountebanks, The Spectre Knight, The Sultan of Mocha, Topsyturveydom
François Cellier (1849–1914): Captain Billy
Friedrich Cerha (1926–2023): Baal, Der Rattenfänger, Der Riese von Steinfeld
Antonio Cesti (1623–1669): Orontea, Il pomo d'oro
Emmanuel Chabrier (1841–1894): Briséïs, Une éducation manquée, L'étoile, Fisch-Ton-Kan, Gwendoline, Le roi malgré lui
Ruperto Chapí (1851–1909): Roger de Flor, Música clásica, La serenata, Las bravías, La revoltosa, El puñao de rosas, Margarita la tornera
Gustave Charpentier (1860–1956): Julien, Louise
Marc-Antoine Charpentier (1643–1704): Actéon, Les arts florissants, David et Jonathas, La descente d'Orphée aux enfers, Médée, Les plaisirs de Versailles
Francis Chassaigne (1847–1922): Le droit d'aînesse
Ernest Chausson (1855–1899): Le roi Arthus
Carlos Chávez (1899–1978): The Visitors
Deborah Cheetham (fl. 2011): Pecan Summer
Luigi Cherubini (1760–1842): Les Abencérages, Anacréon, Le crescendo, Les deux journées, Eliza, Faniska, L'hôtellerie portugaise, Lodoïska, Médée, Pimmalione
Unsuk Chin (1961– ): Alice in Wonderland
Michael Ching (1958– ): Buoso's Ghost, A Midsummer Night's Dream: Opera A Cappella, Speed Dating Tonight!
Francesco Cilea (1866–1950): Adriana Lecouvreur, L'arlesiana, Gloria
Domenico Cimarosa (1749–1801): L'Armida immaginaria, Le astuzie femminili, La Cleopatra, Le donne rivali, La finta parigina, Giannina e Bernardone, L'impresario in angustie, Il maestro di cappella, Il matrimonio segreto, Gli Orazi e i Curiazi
Frederic Clay (1838–1889): Ages Ago, The Gentleman in Black, Happy Arcadia, Princess Toto
Thomas Clayton (1673–1725): Rosamond, Arsinoe, Queen of Cyprus
Carlo Coccia (1782–1873): Arrighetto, Caterina di Guisa, Clotilde
Juan J. Colomer (1966–): El Pintor, Dulcinea XL
Paul Constantinescu (1909–1963): Pana Lesnea Rusalim, A stormy night, O noapte furtunoasa
David Conte (1955– ): The Dreamers, Gift of the Magi
Aaron Copland (1900–1990): The Second Hurricane, The Tender Land
Azio Corghi (1937–2022): Il dissoluto assolto, Divara – Wasser und Blut
John Corigliano (1938– ): The Ghosts of Versailles
Peter Cornelius (1824–1874): Der Barbier von Bagdad, Der Cid, Gunlöd
Noël Coward (1899–1973): Bitter Sweet
Frederic Hymen Cowen (1852–1935): Harold or the Norman Conquest, Pauline, Signa, Thorgrim
César Cui (1835–1918): Angelo, The Captain's Daughter, Feast in Time of Plague, Le flibustier, Ivan the Fool, Little Red Riding Hood, Mademoiselle Fifi, The Mandarin's Son, Mateo Falcone, Prisoner of the Caucasus, Puss in Boots, The Saracen, The Snow Bogatyr, William Ratcliff
César Cui, Nikolai Rimsky-Korsakov, Modest Mussorgsky, Alexander Borodin: Mlada
Douglas J. Cuomo (1958– ): Doubt
Charles Cuvillier (1877–1955): Lilac Domino
Chaya Czernowin (1957– ): Pnima...ins Innere, Adama

D
Nicolas Dalayrac (1753–1809): L'amant statue, Les deux petits savoyards, Nina
Luigi Dallapiccola (1904–1975): Job, Il prigioniero, Ulisse, Volo di notte
Ikuma Dan (1924–2001): Yūzuru (Twilight Crane), Takeru
Richard Danielpour (1956– ): Margaret Garner
Alexander Dargomyzhsky (1813–1869): Rusalka, The Stone Guest (Kammeny Gost)
Michael Kevin Daugherty (1954– ): Jackie O
Antoine Dauvergne (1713–1797): Les troqueurs
Peter Maxwell Davies (1934–2016): The Doctor of Myddfai, Eight Songs for a Mad King, Kommilitonen!, The Lighthouse, The Martyrdom of St Magnus, Mr Emmet Takes a Walk, Resurrection, Taverner
Victor Davies (1939– ): Transit of Venus
Anthony Davis (1951– ): X, The Life and Times of Malcolm X, Under the Double Moon, Tania, Amistad, Wakonda's Dream
Don Davis (1957– ): Río de Sangre
Claude Debussy (1862–1918): Pelléas et Mélisande, Rodrigue et Chimène, Le diable dans le beffroi, La chute de la maison Usher
Reginald De Koven (1859–1920): The Canterbury Pilgrims (De Koven)
Brett Dean (1961– ): Bliss
Miguel del Aguila (1957– ): Time and Again Barelas
Léo Delibes (1836–1891): Jean de Nivelle, Lakmé, Le roi l'a dit
Frederick Delius (1862–1934): Fennimore and Gerda, Koanga, A Village Romeo and Juliet (Romeo und Julia auf dem Dorfe)
Rudolf Dellinger (1857–1910): Don Cesar
Norman Dello Joio (1913–2008): The Triumph of St. Joan
Edison Denisov (1929–1996): Soldier Ivan (Ivan-Soldat), L'écume des jours, Quatre filles
Henri Desmarets (1661–1741): Didon, Vénus et Adonis, Iphigénie en Tauride
Paul Dessau (1894–1979): Die Verurteilung des Lukullus, Einstein
André Cardinal Destouches (1672–1749): Callirhoé, Les élémens, Issé
Anton Diabelli (1781–1858): Adam in der Klemme
Charles Dibdin (1745–1814): The Ephesian Matron, Lionel and Clarissa, The Padlock, The Recruiting Serjeant.
David DiChiera (1935– ): Cyrano
Violeta Dinescu (1953– ): Hunger und Durst, Der 35 Mai, Eréndira, Schachnovelle, Herzriss
Gaetano Donizetti (1797–1848): Adelia, L'ajo nell'imbarazzo, Alahor in Granata, Alfredo il grande, Alina, regina di Golconda, L'Ange de Nisida, Anna Bolena, L'assedio di Calais, Belisario, Betly, Il campanello, Il castello di Kenilworth, Caterina Cornaro, Le convenienze ed inconvenienze teatrali, Il diluvio universale, Le duc d'Albe, Dom Sébastien, Don Pasquale, L'elisir d'amore, Elvida, Emilia di Liverpool, Enrico di Borgogna, L'esule di Roma, Fausta, La favorite (La favorita), La fille du régiment, Francesca di Foix, Gabriella di Vergy, Gemma di Vergy, Gianni di Calais, Gianni di Parigi, Imelda de' Lambertazzi, Linda di Chamounix, Lucia di Lammermoor, Lucrezia Borgia, Maria di Rohan, Maria de Rudenz, Maria Padilla, Maria Stuarda, Marino Faliero, Olivo e Pasquale, Otto mesi in due ore, Il Pigmalione, Parisina, Pia de' Tolomei, Pietro il grande, Poliuto, Rita, Roberto Devereux, Rosmonda d'Inghilterra, Torquato Tasso, Ugo, conte di Parigi, La zingara, Zoraida di Granata
Jonathan Dove (1959– ): The Adventures of Pinocchio, Flight
Sabin Drăgoi (1894–1968): Constantin Brâncoveanu, Horia, Kir Ianulea, The Misfortune (Napasta)
Deborah Drattell (1956– ): Lilith, Nicholas and Alexandra
Paul Dukas (1865–1935): Ariane et Barbe-Bleue
Thomas Dunhill (1877–1946): Tantivy Towers
Egidio Romualdo Duni (1708–1775): L'école de la jeunesse, La fée Urgèle, Le peintre amoureux de son modèle
Pascal Dusapin (1955– ): Medeamaterial, Perelà, uomo di fumo
Alphonse Duvernoy (1842–1907): Le Baron Frick, Hellé
Antonín Dvořák (1841–1904): Alfred, Armida, The Cunning Peasant, The Devil and Kate (Čert a Káča), Dimitrij, The Jacobin (Jakobín), King and Charcoal Burner, Rusalka, The Stubborn Lovers (Tvrdé palice), Vanda

E
John Eaton (1935–2015 ): The Cry of Clytaemnestra, Danton and Robespierre, The Tempest
John Eccles (1668–1735): Semele, The Judgement of Paris
Werner Egk (1901–1983): Peer Gynt, Die Verlobung in San Domingo, Die Zaubergeige
Gottfried von Einem (1918–1996): Der Besuch der alten Dame, Dantons Tod, Kabale und Liebe, Der Prozess
George Enescu (1881–1955): Œdipe
Péter Eötvös (1944– ): Tri sestry, Love and Other Demons, Der goldene Drache
Ferenc Erkel (1810–1893): Bánk bán, Hunyadi László
Camille Erlanger (1863–1919): Le Juif Polonais
Iván Erőd (1936–2019 ): La doncella, el marinero y el estudiante, Die Seidenraupen, Orpheus ex Machina, Der Füssener Totentanz, Die Liebesprobe, Pünktchen und Anton
Edmund Eysler (1874–1949): Bruder Straubinger, Die gold'ne Meisterin

F
Franco Faccio (1840–1891): Amleto
Leo Fall (1873–1925): , Die Dollarprinzessin, Der fidele Bauer, Die geschiedene Frau, Der liebe Augustin (English version: Princess Caprice), Madame Pompadour
Manuel de Falla (1876–1946): Los amores de la Inés, El retablo de maese Pedro, La vida breve
Gabriel Fauré (1845–1924): Pénélope, Prométhée
Giuseppe Farinelli (1769–1836): Calliroe, Il Cid della Spagna, I riti d'Efeso
Ivan Fedele (1953– ): Antigone
Morton Feldman (1926–1987): Neither
Francesco Feo (1691–1761): Andromaca
Brian Ferneyhough (1943– ): Shadowtime
Lorenzo Ferrero (1951– ): Rimbaud, ou le fils du soleil, Marilyn, La figlia del mago, Mare nostro, Night, Salvatore Giuliano, Charlotte Corday, Le Bleu-blanc-rouge et le noir, La nascita di Orfeo, La Conquista, Le piccole storie: Ai margini delle guerre, Risorgimento!
Henry Février (1875–1957): Monna Vanna
Zdeněk Fibich (1850–1900): Blaník, The Bride of Messina (Nevěsta messinská), Bukovín, The Fall of Arkun (Pád Arkuna), Hedy, Šárka, The Tempest (Bouře)
Vivian Fine (1913–2000): The Women in the Garden
Gottfried Finger (c. 1660–1730): The Virgin Prophetess
Michael Finnissy (1946– ): Thérèse Raquin
Valentino Fioravanti (1764–1837): Le cantatrici villane
Elena Firsova (1950– ): A Feast in Time of Plague (Pir vo vremya chumy), The Nightingale and the Rose
Veniamin Fleishman (1913–1941): Rothschild's Violin
Friedrich von Flotow (1812–1883): Alessandro Stradella, Martha
Carlisle Floyd (1926– ): Cold Sassy Tree, Flower and Hawk, Of Mice and Men, Slow Dusk, Susannah, Willie Stark, Wuthering Heights
Josef Bohuslav Foerster (1859–1951): Debora, Eva, Jessika, The Invincible Ones (Nepřemožení), The Heart (Srdce), The Fool a.k.a. The Simpleton (Bloud)
Yevstigney Fomin (1761–1800): Postal Coachmen at the Relay Station (Yamshchiki na podstave)
Ernest Ford (1858–1919): Jane Annie
Jacopo Foroni (1825–1858): Cristina, regina di Svezia
Wolfgang Fortner (1907–1987): Bluthochzeit
Lukas Foss (1922–2009): The Jumping Frog of Calaveras County, Griffelkin, Introductions and Good-byes
Alberto Franchetti (1860–1942): Cristoforo Colombo, Germania, Asrael, La figlia di Iorio
César Franck (1822–1890): Hulda, Ghiselle
François Francoeur (1698–1787) and François Rebel (1701–1775): Pirame et Thisbé, Scanderberg
Harold Fraser-Simson (1872–1944): The Maid of the Mountains
Rudolf Friml (1879–1972): The Firefly, Rose-Marie, The Vagabond King

G
Marco da Gagliano (1582–1643): Dafne
Baldassare Galuppi (1706–1785): Il filosofo di campagna, L'inimico delle donne (L'italiana in Oriente)
Hans Gál (1890–1987): Der Arzt der Sobeide, Die heilige Ente, Das Lied der Nacht, Die beiden Klaas
Louis Ganne (1862–1923): Les saltimbanques
Francesco Gasparini (1661–1727): Ambleto, Tamerlano, Bajazet
Florian Leopold Gassmann (1729–1774): L'amore artigiano, La notte critica
Stanislao Gastaldon (1861–1939): Mala Pasqua!
Pierre Gaveaux (1761–1825): Le trompeur trompé
Joaquín Gaztambide (1822–1870): El estreno de una artista, El juramento, Un pleito, Una vieja
Giuseppe Gazzaniga (1743–1818): Antigono, Il barone di Trocchia, Don Giovanni Tenorio, La donna astuta, Ezio, Il finto cieco
Pietro Generali (1773–1832): Adelina
Roberto Gerhard (1896–1970): The Duenna
Edward German (1862–1936): The Emerald Isle (with Arthur Sullivan), Fallen Fairies, Merrie England, A Princess of Kensington, The Rival Poets, Tom Jones
Thomas German Reed (1817–1888): Eyes and No Eyes, No Cards, Our Island Home, A Sensation Novel
George Gershwin (1898–1937): Blue Monday, Porgy and Bess
Ottmar Gerster (1897–1969): Enoch Arden, Die Hexe von Passau
Geminiano Giacomelli (1692–1740): La Merope
Vittorio Giannini (1903–1966): Blennerhassett, The Taming of the Shrew
Jean Gilbert (1879–1942): Die keusche Susanne
Alberto Ginastera (1916–1983): Bomarzo, Beatrix Cenci, Don Rodrigo
Umberto Giordano (1867–1948): La cena delle beffe, Andrea Chénier, Fedora, Madame Sans-Gêne, Mese mariano, Il re, Siberia
Peggy Glanville-Hicks (1912–1990): Nausicaa, The Transposed Heads
Philip Glass (1937– ): 1000 Airplanes on the Roof, Akhnaten, Appomattox, La Belle et la bête, The Civil Wars: A Tree Is Best Measured When It Is Down, O Corvo Branco, Einstein on the Beach, The Fall of the House of Usher, Galileo Galilei, Hydrogen Jukebox, The Juniper Tree, Kepler, Monsters of Grace, The Photographer, Satyagraha, The Voyage
Mikhail Glinka (1804–1857): A Life for the Tsar (Zhizn za tsarya), Ruslan and Lyudmila
Christoph Willibald Gluck (1714–1787): Alceste, L'arbre enchanté, Armide, Le cadi dupé, Le cinesi, La Cythère assiégée, Le diable à quatre, Echo et Narcisse, La fausse esclave, Le feste d'Apollo, L'ile de Merlin, Iphigénie en Aulide, Iphigénie en Tauride, L'ivrogne corrigé, Orfeo ed Euridice, Paride ed Elena, La rencontre imprévue, Telemaco
Benjamin Godard (1849–1895): Jocelyn
Alexander Goedicke (1877–1957): Virineya (Виринея), At the Crossing (У перевоза), Jacquerie (opera) (Жакерия), Macbeth (Goedicke) (Макбет)
Alexander Goehr (1932– ): Arden Must Die, Arianna, Behold the Sun, Triptych
Hermann Goetz (1840–1876): Der Widerspänstigen Zähmung
Walter Goetze (1883–1961): Der goldene Pierrot, Ihre Hoheit, die Tänzerin
Karl Goldmark (1830–1915): Das Heimchen am Herd, Die Königin von Saba
Osvaldo Golijov (1960– ): Ainadamar
Antônio Carlos Gomes (1836–1896): Condor, Fosca, Il Guarany, Joana de Flandres, Lo schiavo, Maria Tudor, A noite do castelo, Salvator Rosa
Fernando González Casellas (1925–1998): Saverio el Cruel
Ricky Ian Gordon (1956– ): The Grapes of Wrath
François-Joseph Gossec (1734–1829): Les pêcheurs, Sabinus, Thésée, Le tonnelier, Le triomphe de la République
Jakov Gotovac (1895–1982): Ero s onoga svijeta (Ero the Joker)
Charles Gounod (1818–1893): Cinq-Mars, La colombe, Faust, Maître Pierre, Le médecin malgré lui, Mireille, La nonne sanglante, Philémon et Baucis, Polyeucte, La reine de Saba, Roméo et Juliette, Sapho, Le tribut de Zamora
Orlando Gough (1953–): The Finnish Prisoner
Louis Grabu (fl. 1665–1690, died after 1693): Albion and Albanius
Paul Graener (1872–1944): Hanneles Himmelfahrt
Enrique Granados (1867–1916): Goyescas, María del Carmen
Bruno Granichstaedten (1879–1944): Der Orlow
Carl Heinrich Graun (1704–1759): Montezuma
Maurice Greene (1696–1755): Florimel, Phoebe
André Grétry (1741–1813): L'amant jaloux, Andromaque, Aucassin et Nicolette, La caravane du Caire, Colinette à la cour, L’épreuve villageoise, Les deux avares, Guillaume Tell, Le Huron, Le jugement de Midas, Lucile, Les mariages samnites, Pierre le Grand, Richard Coeur-de-lion, Le tableau parlant, Zémire et Azor
George Grossmith (1847–1912): Haste to the Wedding, Cups and Saucers
Jacinto Guerrero (1895–1951): El huésped del Sevillano
Pietro Alessandro Guglielmi (1728–1804): Alceste, La bella pescatrice, La pastorella nobile, Il ratto della sposa, Lo spirito di contradizione, La sposa fedele
Manfred Gurlitt (1890–1973): Wozzeck

H
Pavel Haas (1899–1944): Šarlatán
Alois Hába (1893–1973): The Mother
Henry Kimball Hadley (1871–1937): Azora, the Daughter of Montezuma, Bianca, Cleopatra's Night, A Night in Old Paris, Safié
Daron Hagen (1961– ): Amelia, Shining Brow, Bandanna, Vera of Las Vegas, The Antient Concert, New York Stories
Reynaldo Hahn (1874–1947): Ciboulette
Jakob Haibel (1762–1826): Der Tyroler Wastel
Fromental Halévy (1799–1862): L'artisan, Charles VI, L'éclair, Jaguarita l'Indienne, Le Juif errant, La Juive, Ludovic, Le nabab, Noé, La reine de Chypre, Le val d'Andorre
Iain Hamilton (1922–2000): Anna Karenina, The Catiline Conspiracy, The Royal Hunt of the Sun
George Frideric Handel (1685–1759): Acis and Galatea, Admeto, Agrippina, Alcina, Alessandro, Alessandro Severo, Almira, Amadigi di Gaula, Arianna in Creta, Ariodante, Arminio, Atalanta, Berenice, Deidamia, Ezio, Faramondo, Flavio, Floridante, Florindo, Giove in Argo, Giulio Cesare, Giustino, Hercules, Imeneo, Lotario, Muzio Scevola, Oreste, Orlando, Ottone, Parnasso in festa, Partenope, Il pastor fido, Poro, Radamisto, Riccardo Primo, Rinaldo, Rodelinda, Rodrigo, Samson, Scipione, Semele, Serse, Silla, Siroe, Sosarme, Tamerlano, Teseo, Theodora, Tolomeo
Howard Hanson (1896–1981): Merry Mount
Kazuko Hara (1935–2014): Crime and Punishment, Yosakoi Bushi
John Harbison (1938– ): The Great Gatsby
Stephen Hartke (1952– ): The Greater Good, or the Passion of Boule de Suif
Johann Adolph Hasse (1699–1783): Artaserse, Antonio e Cleopatra, Cleofide, Piramo e Tisbe, Siroe, Il Ruggiero
Joseph Haydn (1732–1809): L'anima del filosofo, Armida, La canterina, La fedeltà premiata, L'infedeltà delusa, L'isola disabitata, Il mondo della luna, Orlando paladino, Lo speziale, La vera costanza, L'incontro improvviso
Jake Heggie (1961– ): Dead Man Walking, The End of the Affair, Last Acts
Peter Arnold Heise (1830–1879): Drot og marsk
Moya Henderson (1941– ): Lindy
Hans Werner Henze (1926–2012): The Bassarids, Boulevard Solitude, Elegy for Young Lovers, The English Cat, Der junge Lord, König Hirsch, Phaedra, Der Prinz von Homburg, L'Upupa und der Triumph der Sohnesliebe, Venus und Adonis, Das verratene Meer, We Come to the River
Victor Herbert (1859–1924): Babes in Toyland, Dream City, The Dream Girl, Eileen, The Fortune Teller, The Magic Knight, Mlle. Modiste, Natoma, Naughty Marietta, Prince Ananias, The Princess Pat, The Red Mill, The Serenade, Sweethearts, The Wizard of the Nile
Ferdinand Hérold (1791–1833): Le pré aux clercs, Zampa
Bernard Herrmann (1911–1975): Wuthering Heights
Philippe Hersant (1948– ): Le Château des Carpathes, Le Moine noir
Hervé (1825–1892): Chilpéric, Don Quichotte et Sancho Pança, Mam'zelle Nitouche
Richard Heuberger (1850–1914): Der Opernball
Juan Hidalgo de Polanco (1614–1685): Celos aun del aire matan, Los celos hacen estrellas, La púrpura de la rosa
Johann Adam Hiller (1728–1804): Die Jagd, Lisuart und Dariolette, Lottchen am Hofe, Die verwandelten Weiber
Paul Hindemith (1895–1963): Cardillac, Die Harmonie der Welt, Hin und zurück, Lehrstück, The Long Christmas Dinner, Mathis der Maler, Mörder, Hoffnung der Frauen, Neues vom Tage, Das Nusch-Nuschi, Sancta Susanna, Wir bauen eine Stadt
Emil Hlobil (1901–1987): Anna Karenina, Měšťák šlechticem (Le Bourgeois gentilhomme), Král Václav IV (King Wenceslaus IV)
Lee Hoiby (1926–2011): The Scarf, Summer and Smoke
E. T. A. Hoffmann (1776–1822): Undine
Igo Hofstetter (1926–2002): Roulette der Herzen, Alles spricht von Charpillon, Schach dem Boss
 York Höller (1944– ): Der Meister und Margarita
Heinz Holliger (1939– ): Schneewittchen
Gustav Holst (1874–1934): The Revoke, The Idea, The Youth's Choice, Sita, At the Boar's Head, The Perfect Fool, Savitri, The Wandering Scholar
Ignaz Holzbauer (1711–1783): Günther von Schwarzburg
Arthur Honegger (1892–1955): Judith, Antigone, Les aventures du roi Pausole, La belle de Moudon, Les petites, L'aiglon (with Jacques Ibert)
Toshio Hosokawa (1955– ): Vision of Lear, Hanjo
Jenő Hubay (1858–1937): Alienor, A cremonai hegedűs (The Violin Maker of Cremona),  (The Village Vagabond), Moharózsa (Moss Rose), Lavotta szerelme, Karenina Anna (Anna Karenina), Az álarc (The Mask), A milói Vénusz (The Venus de Milo), Az önző óriás (The Selfish Giant; based on the story by Oscar Wilde)
Engelbert Humperdinck (1854–1921): Hänsel und Gretel, Königskinder
Ilja Hurník (1922–2013): Dáma a lupiči (The Lady and the Robbers),  (Wisemen and Fools), Rybáři v síti (Fishermen in Their Own Nets), Oldřich a Boženka (Oldřich and Boženka)
Jenő Huszka (1875–1960): Aranyvirág, Prince Bob (Bob herceg), Gül Baba, Baroness Lili (Lili bárónő), Tilos a Bemenet (No Entry)
Ketil Hvoslef (1939– ): Barabbas
Jason Kao Hwang (1957– ): The Floating Box: A Story in Chinatown

I
Vincent d'Indy (1851–1931): Le chant de la cloche, L'étranger, Fervaal, La légende de Saint-Christophe, Le rêve de Cinyras
Nicolas Isouard (1775–1818): Cendrillon, Joconde, Les rendez-vous bourgeois

J
Victor Jacobi (1883–1921): The Bravest Hussar, The Haughty Princess, The Marriage Market, Szibill
Edward Jakobowski (1858–1927): Erminie
Leoš Janáček (1854–1928): The Beginning of a Romance (Počátek Románu), The Cunning Little Vixen (Příhody lišky Bystroušky), Destiny (Osud), The Excursions of Mr. Brouček to the Moon and to the 15th Century (Výlet pana Broučka do XV století/Výlet pana Broučka do Měsíce), From the House of the Dead (Z mrtvého domu), Jenůfa (Její pastorkyňa), Káťa Kabanová, The Makropulos Affair (Věc Makropulos), Šárka
Élisabeth Jacquet de La Guerre (1665–1729): Céphale et Procris
Georg Jarno (1868–1920): Die Försterchristl
Leon Jessel (1871–1942): Schwarzwaldmädel
Alan John (1958– ): The Eighth Wonder, Through the Looking Glass
Niccolò Jommelli (1714–1774): Armida abbandonata, Demofoonte, Fetonte, Iphigenia in Tauride, L'Olimpiade, La schiava liberata, L'uccelellatrice, Vologeso
Scott Joplin (1868–1917): A Guest of Honor, Treemonisha
Wilfred Josephs (1927–1997): Rebecca

K
Emmerich Kálmán (1882–1953): Arizona Lady, Die Bajadere, Gräfin Mariza, Die Csárdásfürstin, Zsuzsi kisasszony, Die Herzogin von Chicago, Kaiserin Josephine, Marinka, Az obsitos (The Soldier on Leave), Tatárjárás, Das Veilchen vom Montmartre, Der Zigeunerprimas (The Gipsy Virtuoso), Die Zirkusprinzessin
Manolis Kalomiris (1883–1962): Protomastoras, The ring of the mother, Anatoli (opera), Konstantinos Palaiologos
Rudolf Kattnigg (1895–1955): Balkanliebe
Nigel Keay (1955– ): At the Hawk's Well
Reinhard Keiser (1674–1739): Croesus, Fredegunda, Masagniello, Octavia, Ulysses
Jerome Kern (1885–1945): Show Boat
Wilhelm Kienzl (1857–1941): Der Evangelimann, Der Kuhreigen
Leanna Kirchoff: The Clever Artifice of Harriet and Margaret
Giselher Klebe (1925–2009): Alkmene, Chlestakows Wiederkehr, Die Ermordung Cäsars, Die Fastnachtsbeichte, Figaro läßt sich scheiden, Gervaise Macquart, Jacobowsky und der Oberst, Der Jüngste Tag, Das Mädchen aus Domrémy, Das Märchen von der schönen Lilie, Die Räuber, Das Rendezvous, Die tödlichen Wünsche, Ein wahrer Held
Alexander Knaifel (1943– ): The Canterville Ghost, Alice in Wonderland
Oliver Knussen (1952–2018): Higglety Pigglety Pop!, Where the Wild Things Are
Zoltán Kodály (1882–1967): Háry János
Joonas Kokkonen (1921–1996): The Last Temptations
Walter Kollo (1878–1940): Drei alte Schachteln, Filmzauber, Die Frau ohne Kuss, 
Nikolai Korndorf (1947–2001): MR (Marina and Rainer)
Erich Wolfgang Korngold (1897–1957): Die Kathrin, Der Ring des Polykrates, Die tote Stadt, Violanta, Das Wunder der Heliane
Petr Kotik (1942– ) Many, Many Women
Reginald De Koven (1859–1920): The Knickerbockers, Rip Van Winkle, Rob Roy, Robin Hood
Hans Krása (1899–1944): Brundibár
Fritz Kreisler (1875–1962): Sissy
Ernst Krenek (1900–1991): The Bell Tower, Cefalo e Procri, Der Diktator, Jonny spielt auf, Karl V, Leben des Orest, Orpheus und Eurydike, Schwergewicht, Tarquin, What Price Confidence?
Conradin Kreutzer (1780–1849): Das Nachtlager in Granada, Der Verschwender
Rodolphe Kreutzer (1766–1831): La mort d'Abel
Eduard Künneke (1885–1953): The Cousin from Nowhere
F.L.Æ. Kunzen (1761–1817): Holger Danske

L
Helmut Lachenmann (1935– ): Das Mädchen mit den Schwefelhölzern
Franz Lachner (1803–1890): Caterina Cornaro
Lori Laitman (1955– ): Come to Me In Dreams, The Scarlet Letter, The Three Feathers
Édouard Lalo (1823–1892): Le roi d'Ys, Fiesque
John La Montaine (1920–2013): Novellis, Novellis, The Shephardes Playe, Erode the Greate, Be Glad Then, America
Stefano Landi (1587–1639): La morte d'Orfeo, Il Sant'Alessio
Elena Langer (1974– ): Figaro Gets a Divorce
Rued Langgaard (1893–1952): Antikrist
Isidore de Lara (1858–1935): Messaline
Lars-Erik Larsson (1908–1986): Prinsessan av Cypern
Felice Lattuada (1882–1962): Le preziose ridicule, La tempesta
Elodie Lauten (1950–2014): The Death of Don Juan
Armas Launis (1884–1959): Seven Brothers, Kullervo, Aslak Hetta, Jehudith, among others
Henry Lawes (1595–1662), Henry Cooke (1616–1672) et al.: The Siege of Rhodes
Jean-Marie Leclair (1697–1764): Scylla et Glaucus
Charles Lecocq (1832–1918): La fille de Madame Angot, Giroflé-Girofla, Le petit duc
Ton de Leeuw (1926–1996): Antigone
Nicola LeFanu (1947– ): Blood Wedding, The Story of Mary O'Neill, Light Passing
Giovanni Legrenzi (1626–1690): I due Cesari, Eteocle e Polinice, Il Giustino, La divisione del mondo, Totila, Zenobia e Radamisto 
Franz Lehár (1870–1948): Endlich allein, Giuditta, Der Göttergatte, Der Graf von Luxemburg, The Land of Smiles (Das Land des Lächelns), The Merry Widow (Die lustige Witwe), Paganini, Der ZarewitschJean-Baptiste Lemoyne (1751–1796) Électre, Nephté, PhèdreNicholas Lens (1957– ): Slow Man, Shell ShockRuggero Leoncavallo (1857–1919): Are You There?, La bohème, Chatterton, Edipo re, Goffredo Mameli, La jeunesse de Figaro, Maià, I Medici, Pagliacci, Der Roland von Berlin, Zazà, ZingariJean-François Le Sueur (1760–1837): La caverne, La mort d'Adam, Ossian, ou Les bardesGyörgy Ligeti (1923–2006): Le Grand MacabreLiza Lim (1966– ): The NavigatorPaul Lincke (1866–1946): Frau LunaPeter Josef von Lindpaintner (1791–1856): Der VampyrThomas Linley the elder (1733–1795): The DuennaVatroslav Lisinski (1819–1854): PorinFranz Liszt (1811–1886): Don SancheAntonio de Literes (1673–1747): Los elementos, Acis y Galatea, Júpiter y SemeleRicardo Llorca (1962– ): Las horas vaciasGeorge Lloyd (1913–1998): John SocmanMatthew Locke (1621–1677): The Cruelty of the Spaniards in Peru, The History of Sir Francis DrakeEdward Loder (1813–1865): Raymond and Agnes Richard Harvey Lohr: KenilworthAlbert Lortzing (1801–1851): Die beiden Schützen, Hans Sachs, Die Opernprobe, Undine, Der Waffenschmied, Der Wildschütz, Zar und Zimmermann Charles Lucas: The RegicideJean-Baptiste Lully (1632–1687): Achille et Polyxène, Acis et Galatée, Alceste, Amadis, Armide, Atys, Bellérophon, Cadmus et Hermione, Les fêtes de l'amour et de Bacchus, Isis, Pastorale comique, Persée, Phaëton, Proserpine, Psyché, Roland, ThéséeMeyer Lutz (1829–1903): Faust and MargueriteRalph Lyford (1882–1927): Castle AgrazantMykola Lysenko (1842–1912): Natalka Poltavka, Taras Bulba, May NightM
Lorin Maazel (1930–2014): 1984Hamish MacCunn (1868–1916): Jeanie DeansGeorge Alexander Macfarren (1813–1887): Robin Hood, She Stoops to Conquer, HelvellynAlexander Mackenzie (1847–1935): Colomba, His MajestyJames MacMillan (1959– ): Inés de Castro, The Sacrifice, ClemencyElizabeth Maconchy (1907–1994): The Departure, The Sofa, The Three StrangersBruno Maderna (1920–1973): SatyriconLeevi Madetoja (1887–1947): The Ostrobothnians (Pohjalaisia), JuhaAlbéric Magnard (1865–1914): Bérénice, GuercœurErnst Mahle (1929– ): A Moreninha, Marroquinhas Fru-Fru, O GaratujaMesías Maiguashca (1938– ): Los enemigosAimé Maillart (1817–1871): Les dragons de VillarsKiril Makedonski (1925–1984): GoceGian Francesco Malipiero (1882–1973): Torneo notturnoFrancesco Mancini (1672–1737): L’Idaspe fedelePhilippe Manoury (1952– ): 60th Parallel, KNikolaos Mantzaros (1795–1872): Don CrepuscoloMarin Marais (1656–1728): Alcyone, SéméléFilippo Marchetti (1831–1902): Romeo e Giulietta, Ruy BlasMiguel Marqués (1843–1918): Perla, El zortzico, El reloj de LucernaHeinrich Marschner (1795–1861): Hans Heiling, Der Templer und die Jüdin, Der VampyrVicente Martín y Soler (1754–1806): L'arbore di Diana, Una cosa rara, Il burbero di buon cuoreBohuslav Martinů (1890–1959): Alexandre bis, Ariane, Comedy on the Bridge (Veselohra na mostě), The Greek Passion (Řecké pašije), Julietta, The Marriage (Ženitba), Mirandolina, The Plays of Mary (Hry o Marii), Les trois souhaits, The Voice of the Forest (Hlas lesa), What Men Live By (Čím člověk žije)
Pietro Mascagni (1863–1945): Amica, L'amico Fritz, Cavalleria rusticana, Guglielmo Ratcliff, Iris, Isabeau, Lodoletta, Le maschere, Nerone, Parisina, Il piccolo Marat, I Rantzau, Silvano, ZanettoBenedict Mason (1954– ): Playing AwayVictor Massé (1822–1884): Les noces de JeannetteJules Massenet (1842–1912): Amadis, Ariane, Bacchus, Cendrillon, Chérubin, Le Cid, Cléopâtre, Don César de Bazan, Don Quichotte, Esclarmonde, La grand'tante, Grisélidis, Hérodiade, Le jongleur de Notre-Dame, Le mage, Manon, La Navarraise, Panurge, Le portrait de Manon, Le roi de Lahore, Roma, Sapho, Thaïs, Thérèse, WertherTeizo Matsumura (1929–2007): Chinmoku (Silence)
Siegfried Matthus (1934–2021): Graf Mirabeau, Judith, Der letzte Schuss, Die unendliche Geschichte, Die Weise von Liebe und Tod des Cornets Christoph RilkeNicholas Maw (1935–2009): The Rising of the Moon, Sophie's ChoiceSimon Mayr (1763–1845): L'amor coniugale, Ginevra di Scozia, La Lodoiska, Medea in Corinto, La rosa bianca e la rosa rossa, Fedra, Adelaide di GuesclinoToshiro Mayuzumi (1929–1997): Kinkakuji (The Golden Pavilion)
Domenico Mazzocchi (1592–1665): La catena d'AdoneVirgilio Mazzocchi (1597–1646) and Marco Marazzoli (c. 1602 to 1608–1662): Chi soffre, speriRichard Meale (1932–2009): VossKirke Mechem (1925– ): TartuffeÉtienne Méhul (1763–1817): Adrien, Les amazones, Ariodant, Euphrosine, Horatius Coclès, L'irato, Le jeune Henri, Joseph, Mélidore et Phrosine, Stratonice, UthalAlessandro Melani (1639–1703): L'empio punitoJacopo Melani (1623–1676): Girello, Il potestà di ColognoleErkki Melartin (1875–1937): AinoFelix Mendelssohn (1809–1847): Die beiden Neffen, Die beiden Pädagogen, Die Heimkehr aus der Fremde, Die Hochzeit des Camacho, Die SoldatenliebschaftGian Carlo Menotti (1911–2007): Amahl and the Night Visitors, Amelia Goes to the Ball, The Boy Who Grew Too Fast, The Consul, Help, Help, the Globolinks!, The Last Savage, Maria Golovin, The Medium, The Old Maid and the Thief, The Saint of Bleecker Street, The Telephone, or L'Amour à troisSaverio Mercadante (1795–1870): Il bravo, I briganti, Elena da Feltre, Elisa e Claudio, Il giuramento, Orazi e Curiazi, Il reggente, La vestale, Virginia, The Most Important ManAarre Merikanto (1893–1958): JuhaOskar Merikanto (1868–1927): The Maiden of the North (1898), The Death of Elina (1910), Regina von Emmeritz (1920)
André Messager (1853–1929): L'amour masqué, La Basoche, La Béarnaise, Béatrice, Le bourgeois de Calais, Coups de roulis, La fauvette du temple, Fortunio, François les bas-bleus, Isoline, Le mari de la reine, Madame Chrysanthème, Mirette, Monsieur Beaucaire, Passionément, La petite fonctionnaire, Les p'tites Michu, VéroniqueOlivier Messiaen (1908–1992): Saint François d'AssiseGiacomo Meyerbeer (1791–1864): L'Africaine, Il crociato in Egitto, Dinorah, L'esule di Granata, L'étoile du nord, Ein Feldlager in Schlesien, Les Huguenots, Jephtas Gelübde, Margherita d'Anjou, Le prophète, Robert le diable, Semiramide riconosciutaMarcel Mihalovici (1898–1985): Krapp, ou, La dernière bandeMinoru Miki (1930–2011): Ada, An Actor's Revenge, Ai-en, Genji monogatari, The Happy Pagoda, Jōruri, The Monkey Poet, The River Sumida / Kusabira, Shizuka and Yoshitsune, Shunkinshō, Terute and Oguri, Wakahime, YomigaeruDarius Milhaud (1892–1974): L'abandon d'Ariane, Bolivar, Christophe Colomb, David, La mère coupable, Le pauvre matelotCarl Millöcker (1842–1899): Der arme Jonathan, Der Bettelstudent, Gräfin Dubarry, Gasparone, Das verwunschene SchlossRichard Mills (1949– ): Summer of the Seventeenth Doll, Batavia, The Love of the NightingaleJean-Joseph de Mondonville (1711–1772): Les fêtes de Paphos, Titon et l'AuroreStanisław Moniuszko (1819–1872): The Countess (Hrabina), Halka, The Haunted Manor (Straszny dwór), Verbum nobileMeredith Monk (1942– ): AtlasPierre-Alexandre Monsigny (1729–1817): Aline, reine de Golconde, Le déserteur, On ne s'avise jamais de tout, Le roi et le fermierMichel Pignolet de Montéclair (1667–1737): Les festes de l'été, JephtéItalo Montemezzi (1875–1952): L'amore dei tre re, Giovanni Galurese, Hellera, L'incantesimo, La nave, La notte di ZoraimaJosé Ángel Montero (1832–1881): VirginiaClaudio Monteverdi (1567–1643): L'Arianna, L'incoronazione di Poppea, L'Orfeo, Il ritorno d'Ulisse in patriaDouglas Moore (1893–1969): The Ballad of Baby Doe, The Devil and Daniel Webster, Carry Nation, Giants in the EarthRobert Moran (1937– ): Desert of Roses, The Dracula Diary, From the Towers of the Moon, The Juniper Tree, The Night PassageFederico Moreno Torroba (1891–1982): Luisa Fernanda, La Chulapona, La Virgen de Mayo, El poetaLodewijk Mortelmans (1868–1952): De Kinderen van Zee (The Children of the Sea)
Jean-Joseph Mouret (1682–1738): Les amours de RagondeWolfgang Amadeus Mozart (1756–1791): Apollo et Hyacinthus, Ascanio in Alba, Bastien und Bastienne, La clemenza di Tito, Così fan tutte, Don Giovanni, Die Entführung aus dem Serail, La finta giardiniera, La finta semplice, Idomeneo, Lucio Silla, The Magic Flute, The Marriage of Figaro, Mitridate, re di Ponto, L'oca del Cairo, Il re pastore, Der Schauspieldirektor, Die Schuldigkeit des ersten Gebots, Il sogno di Scipione, Lo sposo deluso, Thamos, King of Egypt, ZaideWenzel Müller (1767–1835): Alpenkönig und der Menschenfeind, Der Barometermacher auf der Zauberinsel, Die gefesselte Phantasie, Kaspar der Faggotist, Das Neusonntagskind, Das Sonnenfest der Braminen, Die Teufelsmühle am WienerbergeVano Muradeli (1908–1970): The Great Friendship, Moscow-Paris-MoscowThea Musgrave (1928– ): A Christmas Carol, The Decision, Harriet, the Woman called 'Moses', Mary, Queen of Scots, An Occurrence at Owl Creek Bridge, The Voice of AriadneModest Mussorgsky (1839–1881): Boris Godunov, The Fair at Sorochyntsi (Sorochinskaya Yarmarka), Khovanshchina, Zhenitba (The Marriage), SalammbôEmanuele Muzio (1821–1890): Giovanna la pazza, Claudia, Le due regine, La sorrentinaJosef Mysliveček (1737–1781): Adriano in Siria (Mysliveček), Antigona, Antigono, Armida, Artaserse, Atide, Il Bellerofonte, La Calliroe, La Circe, La clemenza di Tito, Demetrio [1st version], Demetrio [2nd version], Demofoonte [1st version], Demofoonte [2nd version], Ezio [1st version], Ezio [2nd version], Farnace, Tamerlano, Ipermestra (Mysliveček), Medonte (Mysliveček), Motezuma, La Nitteti, L'Olimpiade, Romolo ed Ersilia, Semiramide, Il trionfo di CleliaN
Nicolas Nabokov (1903–1978): Love's Labour's LostEduard Nápravník (1839–1916): DubrovskyIsaac Nathan (1792–1864): Don John of AustriaOskar Nedbal (1874–1930): Polská krev, VinobraníChristian Gottlob Neefe (1748–1798): Adelheit von VeltheimViktor Nessler (1841–1890): Der Rattenfänger von Hameln, Der Trompeter von SäkkingenOtto Nicolai (1810–1849): The Merry Wives of WindsorEdmund Nick (1891–1973): Das kleine HofkonzertLouis Niedermeyer (1802–1861): Marie Stuart, StradellaCarl Nielsen (1865–1931): Maskarade, Saul og DavidAlessandro Nini (1805–1880): La marescialla d'AncreLuigi Nono (1924–1990): Al gran sole carico d'amore, Intolleranza 1960, PrometeoSerge Noskov (1956– ): KuratovVítězslav Novák (1870–1949): Lucerna (The Lantern)
Ivor Novello (1893–1951): The Dancing Years, Perchance to Dream, King's RhapsodyMichael Nyman (1944– ): Facing Goya, Letters, Riddles and Writs, Love Counts, Man and Boy: Dada, The Man Who Mistook His Wife for a Hat, Noises, Sounds & Sweet Airs, Tristram ShandyO
Jacques Offenbach (1819–1880): Le 66,  Apothicaire et perruquier, Bagatelle, Barbe-bleue, Barkouf, Ba-ta-clan, Les bavards, La belle Hélène, La bonne d'enfant, Les brigands, La chanson de Fortunio, Le château à Toto, La chatte métamorphosée en femme, La créole, Croquefer, ou Le dernier des paladins, Daphnis et Chloé, Les deux aveugles, Fantasio, La fille du tambour-major, Le financier et le savetier, Geneviève de Brabant, La Grande-Duchesse de Gérolstein, L'île de Tulipatan, La jolie parfumeuse, Lischen et Fritzchen, Madame Favart, Madame l'archiduc, Le mariage aux lanternes, Mesdames de la Halle, M. Choufleuri restera chez lui , Monsieur et Madame Denis, Orpheus in the Underworld, La Périchole, La permission de dix heures, Pierrette et Jacquot, Le pont des soupirs, Robinson Crusoé, La rose de Saint-Flour, The Tales of Hoffmann, Tromb-al-ca-zar, ou Les criminels dramatiques, Un mari à la porte, Vert-Vert, La Vie parisienne, Le violoneux, Le voyage dans la luneCarl Orff (1895–1982): Antigonae, De temporum fine comoedia, Der Mond, Die Kluge, PrometheusGiuseppe Maria Orlandini (1676–1760): BereniceP
Giovanni Pacini (1796–1867): Alessandro nelle Indie, Amazilia, Bondelmonte, Carlo di Borgogna, Il corsaro, Lorenzino de' Medici, Maria, regina d'Inghilterra, Medea, Saffo, L'ultimo giorno di PompeiFredrik Pacius (1809–1891): Kung Karls jakt, Prinsessan av CypernFerdinando Paer (1771–1839): Achille, Agnese (opera), Camilla, I fuorusciti di Firenze, Leonora, Le maître de chapelleGiovanni Paisiello (1741–1816): Il barbiere di Siviglia, Le due contesse, Elfrida, Fedra, I filosofi immaginari, La Frascatana, I giuochi d'Agrigento, La modesta raggiratrice, La molinara, Nina, Nitteti, Pirro, Proserpine, Il re Teodoro in Venezia, Sismano nel MogolZakaria Paliashvili (1871–1933): Absalom and Eteri, Daisi, Latavra Selim Palmgren (1878–1951): Daniel HjortRoxanna Panufnik (1968– ): The Music ProgrammeJorma Panula (1930– ): Jaakko IlkkaGérard Pape (1955– ): Les Cenci, Ivan and Rena, A Little Girl Dreams of Taking the Veil, MonologueIan Parrott (1916–2012): The Black RamThomas Pasatieri (1945– ): Before Breakfast, Black Widow, Calvary, La Divina, A Flea in her Ear, Flowers of Ice, Frau Margot, The Goose Girl, The Hotel Casablanca, Inés de Castro, Maria Elena, Padrevia, The Penitentes, The Seagull, Signor Deluso, Three Sisters, The Trial of Mary Lincoln, The Trysting Place, Washington Square, The WomenJiří Pauer (1919–2007): Zuzana VojiřováStephen Paulus (1947– ): The Postman Always Rings TwiceCarlo Pedrotti (1817–1893): Tutti in mascheraJorge Peña Hen (1928–1973): La CenicientaKrzysztof Penderecki (1933–2020): The Devils of Loudun, Paradise Lost, Die schwarze Maske, Ubu RexManuel Penella (1880–1939): El gato montésJohann Christoph Pepusch (1667–1752): Thomyris, Queen of Scythia, The Beggar's OperaDavide Perez (1711–1778): SolimanoGiovanni Battista Pergolesi (1710–1736): Adriano in Siria, Lo frate 'nnamorato, Livetta e Tracollo, L'Olimpiade, Il prigionier superbo, La serva padronaJacopo Peri (1561–1633): Dafne, EuridiceGiuseppe Persiani (c. 1799/1805–1869): Ines de CastroGiacomo Antonio Perti (1661–1756): L'incoronazione di DarioWilhelm Peterson-Berger (1867–1942): Arnljot, The Doomsday ProphetsErrico Petrella (1813–1877): Il carnevale di Venezia, Jone, I promessi sposiHans Pfitzner (1869–1949): Der arme Heinrich, Das Christ-Elflein, Das Herz, Palestrina, Die Rose vom LiebesgartenFrançois-André Danican Philidor (1726–1795): Blaise le savetier, Ernelinde, princesse de Norvège, Le maréchal ferrant, Tom JonesAstor Piazzolla (1921–1992): María de Buenos AiresNiccolò Piccinni (1728–1800): L'americano, Atys, La buona figliuola, La buona figliuola maritata, Catone in Utica, Didon, Le donne vendicate, Ercole al Termedonte, Iphigénie en Tauride, RolandTobias Picker (1954– ): An American Tragedy, Emmeline, Fantastic Mr. Fox, Thérèse RaquinWillem Pijper (1894–1947): Helewijn, MerlijnMatthias Pintscher (1971– ): Thomas ChattertonIldebrando Pizzetti (1880–1968): Fedra, Dèbora e Jaéle, Fra Gherardo, Lo straniero, L'oro, Ifigenia, Assassinio nella cattedrale, ClitennestraRobert Planquette (1848–1903): Les cloches de Corneville, Nell Gwynne, Rip Van WinkleLudvík Podéšť (1921–1968): Když se Anička vdávala, Slepice a kostelník, Bez cymbálu nejsou hody, Tři apokryfy (Staré zlaté časy; Svatá noc; Romeo a Julie), Hrátky s čertem, Emílek a dynamit, Filmová hvězdaAmilcare Ponchielli (1834–1886): Il figliuol prodigo, La Gioconda, I Lituani, Marion Delorme, I promessi sposiNicola Porpora (1686–1768): Arianna in Nasso, Semiramide riconosciuta, TemistocleGiovanni Porta (1675–1755): Numitore, Ifigenia in AulideRachel Portman (1960– ): The Little PrinceFrancis Poulenc (1899–1963): Dialogues of the Carmelites, Les mamelles de Tirésias, La voix humaineHenri Pousseur (1929–2009): Votre Faust, Die Erprobung des Petrus Hebraïcus, Leçons d'Enfer, Don Juan à Gnide ou les Séductions de la ChastetéAndré Previn (1929–2019): A Streetcar Named Desire, Brief EncounterSergei Prokofiev (1891–1953): Betrothal in a Monastery (The Duenna) (Obrucheniye v monastyre), The Fiery Angel (Ognenniy angel), The Gambler (Igrok), The Love for Three Oranges (Lyubov k tryom apelsinam), Maddalena, Semyon Kotko, The Story of a Real Man (Povest' o nastoyashchem cheloveke), War and Peace (Voyna i mir)
Giacomo Puccini (1858–1923): La bohème, Edgar, La fanciulla del West, Gianni Schicchi, Madama Butterfly, Manon Lescaut, La rondine, Suor Angelica, Il tabarro, Tosca, Il trittico, Turandot, Le VilliHenry Purcell (1659–1695): Dido and Aeneas, Dioclesian, The Fairy-Queen, The Indian Queen, King ArthurEduard Pütz (1911–2000): Riders to the SeaQ
Joseph Quesnel (1746–1809): Colas et Colinette, Lucas et CécileR
Henri Rabaud (1873–1949): Mârouf, savetier du CaireSergei Rachmaninoff (1873–1943): Aleko, Francesca da Rimini, The Miserly Knight (Skupoy rytsar), Monna VannaVäinö Raitio (1891–1945): The Daughter of Jephtha, Princess Cecilia, The King of Lydia, Väinämöinen's Proposal, The Two Queens 
Jean-Philippe Rameau (1683–1764): Acante et Céphise, Anacréon (1754), Anacréon (1757), Les Boréades, Castor et Pollux, Daphnis et Eglé, Dardanus, Les fêtes d'Hébé, Les fêtes de l'Hymen et de l'Amour, Les fêtes de Polymnie, Les fêtes de Ramire, La guirlande, Hippolyte et Aricie, Les Indes galantes, Io, Naïs, La naissance d'Osiris, Nélée et Myrthis, Les Paladins, Pigmalion, Platée, La princesse de Navarre, Les sibarites, Les surprises de l'Amour, Le temple de la Gloire, Zaïs, Zéphire, ZoroastreEinojuhani Rautavaara (1928– ): Aleksis Kivi, Rasputin, Vincent, among others
Maurice Ravel (1875–1937): L'enfant et les sortilèges, L'heure espagnoleFred Raymond (1900–1954): Geliebte Manuela, Maske in Blau, Saison in SalzburgEmil Reesen (1887–1964): FarinelliSteve Reich (1936– ): The Cave, Three TalesJohann Friedrich Reichardt (1752–1814): Brenno, Claudine von Villa Bella, Erwin und ElmireAribert Reimann (1936– ): Melusine, Lear, Die Gespenstersonate, Troades, Das Schloß, MedeaOttorino Respighi (1879–1936): Belfagor, La bella dormente nel bosco, La campana sommersa, La fiamma, Maria egiziacaHermann Reutter (1900–1985): Saul, Der verlorene Sohn, Doktor Johannes Faust, Odysseus, Der Weg nach Freudenstadt, Don Juan und Faust, Der Tod des Empedokles, Die Brücke von San Luis Rey, Die Witwe von Ephesus, HamletErnest Reyer (1823–1909): Salammbô, SigurdAlfred Reynolds (1884–1969): Derby DayEmil von Reznicek (1860–1945): Donna DianaWilliam Barnes Rhodes (1772–1826): Bombastes FuriosoFederico Ricci (1809–1877) & Luigi Ricci (1805–1859): Crispino e la comareFerdinand Ries (1784–1838): Die RäuberbrautWolfgang Rihm (1952– ): Die Eroberung von Mexico, Faust und Yorick, Die Hamletmaschine, Jakob Lenz, Oedipus, Séraphin, DionysosNikolai Rimsky-Korsakov (1844–1908): Christmas Eve, The Golden Cockerel (Zolotoy petushok), Kashchey the Deathless (Kashchey bessmertnïy), The Legend of the Invisible City of Kitezh and the Maiden Fevroniya (Skazaniye o nevidimom grade Kitezhe i deve Fevronii), The Maid of Pskov (Pskovityanka), May Night (Mayskaya noch'), Mlada, Mozart and Salieri (Motsart i Sal'yeri), The Noblewoman Vera Sheloga (Boyarïnya Vera Sheloga), Pan Voyevoda, Sadko, Servilia (Serviliya), The Snow Maiden (Snegurochka), The Tale of Tsar Saltan (Skazka o Tsare Saltane), The Tsar's Bride (Tsarskaya nevesta)
Giovanni Alberto Ristori (1692–1753): CalandroArturo Rodas (1954– ) El árbol de los pájarosRobert Xavier Rodriguez (1946– ): La Curandera, FridaGonzalo Roig (1890–1970): Cecilia ValdésJames Rolfe (1961– ): Beatrice ChancySigmund Romberg (1887–1951): The Desert Song, The New Moon, The Student PrinceWilliam Michael Rooke (1794–1847) Amilie, or the Love Test, HenriqueJoseph Willard Roosevelt (1918–2008): And the Walls Came Tumbling DownNed Rorem (1923–2022): Bertha, Miss Julie, Our Town, Three Sisters Who Are Not SistersLuigi Rossi (1597–1653): Orfeo, Il palazzo incantatoGioachino Rossini (1792–1868): Adelaide di Borgogna, Adina, Armida, Aureliano in Palmira, Il barbiere di Siviglia, Bianca e Falliero, La cambiale di matrimonio, La Cenerentola, Ciro in Babilonia, Le comte Ory, Demetrio e Polibio, La donna del lago, Eduardo e Cristina, Elisabetta, regina d'Inghilterra, Ermione, L'equivoco stravagante, La gazza ladra, La gazzetta, L'inganno felice, L'italiana in Algeri, Maometto II (revised as Le siège de Corinthe), Matilde di Shabran, Mosè in Egitto, L'occasione fa il ladro, Otello, La pietra del paragone, Ricciardo e Zoraide, La scala di seta, Semiramide, Sigismondo, Il signor Bruschino, Tancredi, Torvaldo e Dorliska, Il turco in Italia, Il viaggio a Reims, William Tell, ZelmiraNino Rota (1911–1979): Il cappello di paglia di Firenze, I due timidiJean-Jacques Rousseau (1712–1778): Le devin du villageAlbert Roussel (1869–1937): La naissance de la lyre, Padmâvatî, Le testament de la tante CarolineJoseph-Nicolas-Pancrace Royer (c. 1705–1755): Zaïde, reine de GrenadeAnton Rubinstein (1829–1894): Christus, The Demon, Dmitry Donskoy, Feramors, Fomka the Fool, Die Kinder der Heide, Die Maccabäer, The Merchant Kalashnikov, Moses, Néron, Der Thurm zu BabelPoul Ruders (1949– ): The Handmaid's TaleJohn Rutter (1945– ): Bang!S
Kaija Saariaho (1952– ): L'amour de loin, Adriana Mater, ÉmilieAntonio Sacchini (1730–1786): Armida, Arvire et Évélina, Calliroe, Chimène, La contadina in corte, Creso, Dardanus, Œdipe à Colone, RenaudFrancesco Sacrati (1605–1650): La finta pazzaShigeaki Saegusa (1942– ): ChushinguraCamille Saint-Saëns (1835–1921): Ascanio, Déjanire, Étienne Marcel, Hélène, Henry VIII, Phryné, La princesse jaune, Samson et Dalila, Le timbre d'argentTheophrastos Sakellaridis (1883–1950): Hymenaios (opera), The pirate (opera), PerouzéLuis H. Salgado (1903–1977): Cumandá, El tribuno, El Centurión, Eunice, Escenas del CorpusAntonio Salieri (1750–1825): Armida, Axur, re d'Ormus, La cifra, Les Danaïdes, Europa riconosciuta, Falstaff, La fiera di Venezia, La grotta di Trofonio, Les Horaces, Palmira, regina di Persia, Prima la musica e poi le parole, Der Rauchfangkehrer, La scuola de' gelosi, TarareAulis Sallinen (1935– ): The Red Line, The King Goes Forth to France, The Horseman, Kullervo, The Palace, King LearErkki Salmenhaara (1941–2002): Portugalin nainenSpyridon Samaras (1861–1917): Flora mirabilis, Medgé, Lionella, La martire, La furia domata, Storia d'amore o La biondinetta, Mademoiselle de Belle-Isle, RheaGiovanni Battista Sammartini (1700/1701–1775): MemetSven-David Sandström (1942– ): Jeppe: The Cruel ComedyDomenico Sarro (1679–1744): Achille in Sciro, Didone abbandonata, PartenopeGiuseppe Sarti (1729–1802): Armida e Rinaldo, Didone abbandonata, Fra i due litiganti il terzo gode, Le gelosie villane, Giulio Sabino, Medonte, re di EpiroAntonio Sartorio (1630–1680): Adelaide, Giulio Cesare in Egitto, OrfeoErik Satie (1866–1925): Geneviève de BrabantHenri Sauguet (1901–1989): Les caprices de Marianne, La chartreuse de ParmeDavid Sawer (1961– ): From Morning to MidnightAhmed Adnan Saygun (1907–1991): ÖzsoyAlessandro Scarlatti (1660–1725): Griselda, Mitridate Eupatore, Tigrane, Il trionfo dell'onore, Sedecia, Telemaco, Il Pirro e DemetrioDomenico Scarlatti (1685–1757): Berenice, regina d'EgittoGiuseppe Scarlatti (1718 or 18 June 1723–17 Aug 1777): L'isola disabitataAndrea Lorenzo Scartazzini (born 1971): Wut, Der Sandmann, Edward II.
Benedikt Schack (1758–1826): Der Stein der WeisenPierre Schaeffer (1910–1995): Orphée 53R. Murray Schafer (1933–2021): The Princess of the StarsPeter Schat (1935–2003): Labyrint, Houdini, SymposionJohann Baptist Schenk (1753–1836): Der DorfbarbierFriedrich Schenker (1942–2013): BettinaPeter Schickele (P. D. Q. Bach) (1935– ): The Abduction of FigaroMax von Schillings (1868–1933): Mona LisaLudwig Schmidseder (1904–1971): Melodie der Nacht, Die oder Keine, Frauen im Metropol, AbschiedswalzerFranz Schmidt (1874–1939): Notre DameAlfred Schnittke (1934–1998): Life with an Idiot, Historia von D. Johann Fausten, GesualdoOthmar Schoeck (1886–1957): Massimilla Doni, Penthesilea, Das Schloss Dürande, Venus, Vom Fischer un syner FruArnold Schoenberg (1874–1951): Erwartung, Die glückliche Hand, Von heute auf morgen, Moses und AronFranz Schreker (1878–1934): Christophorus, Der ferne Klang, Die Gezeichneten, Irrelohe, Der Schatzgräber, Der Schmied von Gent, Der singende Teufel, Das SpielwerkFriedrich Schröder (1910–1972): Hochzeitsnacht im ParadiesFranz Schubert (1797–1828): Alfonso und Estrella, Fierrabras, Die Verschworenen, Die ZwillingsbrüderErwin Schulhoff (1894–1942): FlammenGunther Schuller (1925– ): The Visitation, The Fisherman and His WifeAndrew Schultz (1969– ): The Children's BachJohann Abraham Peter Schulz (1747–1800): AthalieWilliam Schuman (1910–1992): The Mighty Casey, A Question of TasteRobert Schumann (1810–1856): GenovevaWalter Schumann (1913–1958): John Brown's BodyJoseph Schuster (1748–1812): Der Alchymist, oder Der LiebesteufelHeinrich Schütz (1585–1672): DafneAnton Schweitzer (1735–1787): Alceste, Die Dorfgala, RosamundeLaura Schwendinger (1962– ): ArtemisiaKurt Schwertsik (1935– ): Die Welt der MongolenSalvatore Sciarrino (1947– ): Da gelo a gelo, Infinito nero, Lohengrin, Luci mie traditrici, Macbeth, Perseo ed AndromedaAntonio Scontrino (1850–1922): MateldaCyril Scott (1879–1970): The AlchemistPeter Sculthorpe (1929–2014): Rites of Passage, QuirosHumphrey Searle (1915–1982): The Diary of a MadmanSeedo (c. 1700–c. 1754): The Devil to PayAlexander Serov (1820–1871): Judith, Rogneda, The Power of the FiendJosé Serrano (1873–1941): La dolorosa, La canción del olvidoPaolo Serrao (1830–1907): L'impostore, Leonora dei Bardi, Pergolesi, La Duchessa di Guisa, Il Figliuol ProdigoRoger Sessions (1896–1985): The Trial of Lucullus, MontezumaJohn Laurence Seymour (1893–1986): In the Pasha's GardenRodion Shchedrin (1932– ): Dead Souls, Levsha, LolitaBright Sheng (1955– ): Madame Mao, The Silver RiverWilliam Shield (1748–1829): The Flitch of Bacon, RosinaAlice Shields (1943– ): ApocalypseHoward Shore (1946– ): The FlyDmitri Shostakovich (1906–1975): The Gamblers (Igroki), Lady Macbeth of Mtsensk (Ledy Macbeth Mtsenskovo uyezda), Moscow, Cheryomushki, The Nose (Nos)
Jean Sibelius (1865–1957): The Maiden in the Tower (Jungfrun i tornet), The Building of the Boat (Veneen luominen)
Elie Siegmeister (1909–1991): The Plough and the StarsRoberto Sierra (1953– ): El mensajero de plataSheila Silver (1946– ): The Thief of LoveChristian Sinding (1856–1941): Der Heilige BergLarry Sitsky (1934– ): De Profundis, The Fall of the House of Usher, Fiery Tales, The Golem, Lenz, Voices in LimboFrantišek Škroup (1801–1862): Fidlovačka Dráteník (The Tinker)
Antonio Smareglia (1854–1929): Nozze istriane, La falena, OceànaBedřich Smetana (1824–1884): The Bartered Bride (Prodaná nevěsta), The Brandenburgers in Bohemia (Braniboři v Čechách), Dalibor, The Devil's Wall (Čertova stěna), The Kiss (Hubička), Libuše, The Secret (Tajemství), The Two Widows (Dvě vdovy), ViolaDmitri Smirnov (1948– ): Tiriel, ThelJohn Christopher Smith (1712–1795): The Fairies, The TempestJulia Smith (1911–1989): Cynthia ParkerMartin Smolka (1959– ): Nagano, Das schlaue GretchenEthel Smyth (1858–1944): The Boatswain's Mate, Der Wald, The WreckersRagnar Søderlind (1945– ): Olav TryggvasonMikhail Sokolovsky (1756–1795): The Miller-Wizard, Cheat and MatchmakerJuan María Solare (1966– ): Veinticinco de agosto, 1983Temistocle Solera (1815–1878): Il contadino d'Agleiate (rev. as La fanciulla di Castelguelfo), Genio e sventura, La hermana de palayo, IldegondaCarlo Evasio Soliva (1791–1853): La testa di bronzo o sia La capanna solitariaEdward Solomon (1855–1895): Billee Taylor, The Nautch Girl, Quite an Adventure, The Red Hussar, The Vicar of BrayHarry Somers (1925–1999): Louis RielS. P. Somtow (Somtow Sucharitkul) (1952– ): Madana, Ayodhya, Mae Naak, Dan No UraStephen Sondheim (1930–2021): Sweeney Todd: The Demon Barber of Fleet StreetFernando Sor (1778–1839): Telemaco nell'isola di CalipsoPablo Sorozábal (1897–1988): La del manojo de rosas, La tabernera del puertoJohn Philip Sousa (1854–1932): Désirée, El CapitanAlexander Spendiaryan (1871–1928): AlmastNiccola Spinelli (1865–1909): A basso portoLouis Spohr (1784–1859): Faust, Jessonda, Zemire und AzorGaspare Spontini (1774–1851): Agnes von Hohenstaufen, Alcidor, Fernand Cortez, Milton, Nurmahal, Olimpie, La vestaleLewis Spratlan (1940– ): Life Is a DreamSigmund Theophil Staden (1607–1665): SeelewigCharles Villiers Stanford (1852–1924): The Canterbury Pilgrims, Much Ado About NothingJohn Stanley (1712–1786): TeramintaRobert Starer (1924–2001): ApolloniaRoman Statkowski (1859–1925): Maria, PhilaenisAgostino Steffani (1653–1728): Henrico LeoneWalter Steffens (born 1934): Eli, Under Milk Wood/Unter dem MilchwaldDaniel Steibelt (1765–1823): Roméo et JulietteWilhelm Stenhammar (1871–1927): TirfingRudi Stephan (1887–1915): Die ersten MenschenGeorge Stephănescu (1843–1925): Sânziana şi PepeleaRoger Steptoe (1953– ): King of Macedon (opera)William Grant Still (1895–1978): Blue Steel, Troubled Island, A Bayou LegendKarlheinz Stockhausen (1928–2007): Atmen gibt das Leben, Licht (Donnerstag, Freitag, Samstag, Sonntag, Montag, Dienstag, Mittwoch)
Petar Stojanović (1877–1957): Devojka na Mansardi, Die Herzog von Reichstadt, Der TigerRobert Stolz (1880–1975): Der Tanz ins Glück, Der verlorene WalzerStephen Storace (1763–1796): Dido, Queen of Carthage, Gli equivoci, The Haunted Tower, The Iron Chest, Lodoiska, No song, no supper, The Pirates, The Siege of Belgrade, Gli sposi malcontentiAlessandro Stradella (1639–1682): Il Trespolo tutoreRobert Strassburg (1915–2003): ChelmOscar Straus (1870–1954): Bozena, The Chocolate Soldier (Der tapfere Soldat), Drei Walzer, Ein Walzertraum, Der letzte WalzerJohann Strauss II (1825–1899): Blindekuh, Cagliostro in Wien, Die Fledermaus, Eine Nacht in Venedig, Indigo und die vierzig Räuber, Der Karneval in Rom, Der lustige Krieg, Prinz Methusalem, Ritter Pázmán, Simplicius, Das Spitzentuch der Königin, Waldmeister, Wiener Blut, Der ZigeunerbaronRichard Strauss (1864–1949): Die ägyptische Helena, Arabella, Ariadne auf Naxos, Capriccio, Daphne, Elektra, Feuersnot, Die Frau ohne Schatten, Friedenstag, Guntram, Intermezzo, Die Liebe der Danae, Der Rosenkavalier, Salome, Die schweigsame FrauIgor Stravinsky (1882–1971): The Flood, Histoire du soldat (Istoria Soldata), Mavra, The Nightingale (Solovei), Oedipus rex, Perséphone, The Rake's Progress, Renard (Bayka pro Lisu, Petukha, Kota da Barana)
Heinrich Strecker (1893–1981): Ännchen von TharauEugen Suchoň (1908–1993): Krútňava, SvätoplukArthur Sullivan (1842–1900): With W. S. Gilbert: The Gondoliers, The Grand Duke, H.M.S. Pinafore, Iolanthe, The Mikado, Patience, The Pirates of Penzance, Princess Ida, Ruddigore, The Sorcerer, Thespis, Trial by Jury, Utopia, Limited, The Yeomen of the Guard; With others: The Beauty Stone, The Chieftain, The Contrabandista, Cox and Box, The Emerald Isle (with Edward German), Haddon Hall, Ivanhoe, The Rose of Persia, The Zoo, (with Henry Fothergill Chorley), The Sapphire NecklaceFranz von Suppé (1819–1895): Banditenstreiche, Boccaccio, Fatinitza, Leichte Kavallerie, Die schöne GalatheeConrad Susa (1935–2013): The Dangerous Liaisons, TransformationsFranz Xaver Süssmayr (1766–1803): Der Spiegel von ArkadienHeinrich Sutermeister (1910–1995): Romeo und Julia, Die schwarze SpinneMargaret Sutherland (1897–1984): The Young KabbarliDonald Swann (1923–1994): PerelandraGiles Swayne (1946– ): Le nozze di CherubinoPiet Swerts (1960– ): Ajas, Les Liaisons dangereuses 
Albert Szirmai (1880–1967): Mágnás Miska, Mézeskalács, Princess Charming, Táncos HuszárokKarol Szymanowski (1882–1937): Hagith, King Roger (Król Roger)

T
Germaine Tailleferre (1892–1983): Du style galant au style méchant, Il était un petit navireOtar Taktakishvili (1924–1989): MindiaJoby Talbot (1971– ): EverestJosef Tal (1910–2008): Saul at Ein Dor, Amnon and Tamar, Ashmedai, Massada 967, The Temptation (Die Versuchung), The Tower (Der Turm), The Garden (Der Garten), JosefLouise Talma (1906–1996): The AlcestiadEino Tamberg (1930–2010): Cyrano de BergeracDavid Tamkin (1906–1975): The DybbukTan Dun (1957– ): The First Emperor, Marco Polo, Peony Pavilion, Tea: A Mirror of SoulSergei Taneyev (1856–1915): OresteiaAngelo Tarchi (1760–1814): L'archetiello, Ademira, Ariarate, Il conte de SaldagnaMikael Tariverdiev (1931–1996): Graf CagliostroVladimir Tarnopolsky (1955– ): The Three GracesPhyllis Tate (1911–1987): The LodgerJohn Tavener (1944–2013): Mary of EgyptDeems Taylor (1885–1966): The King's Henchman, Peter IbbetsonPyotr Ilyich Tchaikovsky (1840–1893): Cherevichki, The Enchantress, Eugene Onegin, Iolanta, The Maid of Orleans (Orleanskaya deva), Mazeppa, The Oprichnik, The Queen of Spades (Pique Dame, Pikovaya dama), Undina, Vakula the Smith, The VoyevodaGeorg Philipp Telemann (1681–1767): Orpheus, PimpinoneOscar Ferdinand Telgmann (c. 1855–1946): Leo, the Royal CadetDomènec Terradellas (1713–1751): MeropeClaude Terrasse (1867–1923): Les travaux d'Hercule, Le sire de VergyFlavio Testi (1923–2014): Saül, Riccardo IIIJohann Theile (1646–1724): Adam und EvaMikis Theodorakis (1925–2021): Kostas Karyotakis (opera), Medea, Antigone, ElectraAmbroise Thomas (1811–1896): La cour de Célimène, Hamlet, MignonArthur Goring Thomas (1850–1892): EsmeraldaRandall Thompson (1899–1984): Solomon and BalkisVirgil Thomson (1896–1989): Four Saints in Three Acts, Lord Byron, The Mother of Us AllFrancis Thorne (1922–2017): Mario and the MagicianJohn Thow (1949–2007): SerpentinaLudwig Thuille (1861–1907): LobetanzIvo Tijardović (1895–1976): Mala Floramye, Splitski AkvarelMichael Tippett (1905–1998): The Ice Break, King Priam, The Knot Garden, The Midsummer Marriage, New Year, Robin HoodCamillo Togni (1922–1993): BlaubartHenri Tomasi (1901–1971): Don Juan de MañaraMichael Torke (1961– ): Strawberry FieldsTomás de Torrejón y Velasco (1644–1728): La púrpura de la rosaCharles Tournemire (1870–1939): Nittetis, Chryséis (Les dieux sont morts), Trilogie Faust – Don Quichotte – Saint François d’Assise, La légende de Tristan, Il poverello di AssisiGeoffrey Toye (1889–1942): The Red PenAntonio Tozzi (1736–1812): La morte di DimoneTommaso Traetta (1727–1779): Antigona, Armida, Ifigenia in Tauride, Ippolito ed Aricia, Le serve rivali, Sofonisba, I TindaridiCornel Trăilescu (1926–2019): BãlcescuEduard Tubin (1905–1982): The Parson of ReigiJoaquín Turina (1882–1949): Margot, Jardín de orienteMark-Anthony Turnage (1960– ): Anna Nicole, Greek, The Silver Tassie, Twice Through the HeartErkki-Sven Tüür (1959– ): WallenbergGeirr Tveitt (1908–1981): DragaredokkoU
Marco Uccellini (1603–1680): Li Eventi di Filandro Et EdessaMartin Andreas Udbye (1820–1889): FredkullaAlfred Uhl (1909–1992): Der mysteriöse Herr XViktor Ullmann (1898–1944): Der Kaiser von AtlantisJosé María Usandizaga (1887–1915): Las golondrinas, La llama, Mendi MendiyanFrancesco Uttini (1723–1795): Birger Jahl och Mechtilde, Thetis och PéléeV
Nicola Vaccai (1790–1848): Giulietta e RomeoFabio Vacchi (1949– ): La station thermaleVincenzo Valente (1855–1921): I granatieriGiuseppe Valentini (1681–1753): La finta rapitaJean Vallerand (1915–1944): Le MagicienLouis Varney (1844–1908): L'Amour mouillé, Les mousquetaires au couvent, Les petites brebisRalph Vaughan Williams (1872–1958): Hugh the Drover, Sir John in Love, The Pilgrim's Progress, The Poisoned Kiss, Riders to the SeaOrazio Vecchi (1550–1605): L'AmfiparnasoAlexander Veprik (1899–1958): Toktogul (Токтогул) (1940), Toktogul (Токтогул) (1949)Giuseppe Verdi (1813–1901): Aida, Alzira, Aroldo, Attila, Un ballo in maschera, La battaglia di Legnano, Il corsaro, Don Carlos, I due Foscari, Ernani, Falstaff, La forza del destino, Un giorno di regno, Giovanna d'Arco, Jérusalem, I Lombardi alla prima crociata, I masnadieri, Luisa Miller, Macbeth, Nabucco, Oberto, Otello, Rigoletto, Simon Boccanegra, Stiffelio, La traviata, Il trovatore, Les vêpres siciliennesAlexey Verstovsky (1799–1862): Askold's Grave (Askol'dova mogila)
Pauline Viardot (1821–1910): CendrillonGerard Victory (1921–1995): The Music hath Mischief, ChattertonHeitor Villa-Lobos (1887–1959): Izaht, YermaLeonardo Vinci (c. 1696–1730): Artaserse, Didone abbandonata, Li zite 'ngaleraFranco Vittadini (1884–1948): Anima Allegra, Caracciolo, Fiammetta e l'avaro, La Sagredo, NazarethAntonio Vivaldi (1678–1741): Ottone in villa, Orlando finto pazzo, Nerone fatto Cesare, Arsilda, regina di Ponto, La costanza trionfante, L'incoronazione di Dario, L'Olimpiade, Tieteberga, Armida al campo d'Egitto, Scanderbeg, Teuzzone, Tito Manlio, La verità in cimento, Ercole su'l Termodonte, Farnace, Orlando furioso, Argippo, Motezuma, Bajazet, Griselda, Dorilla in Tempe, La costanza trionfante degl'amori e de gl'odiiAmadeo Vives (1871–1932): Doña FrancisquitaGiovanni Buonaventura Viviani (1638–1693): AstiageClaude Vivier (1948–1983): KopernikusRoman Vlad (1919–2013): Il dottore di vetroGeorg Joseph Vogler (1749–1814): Castore e Polluce, Der Kaufmann von Smyrna, LampedoHans Vogt (1911–1992): Die Stadt hinter dem StromAndy Vores (1956– ): Freshwater, No ExitAlexander Vustin (1943– ): The Devil in LoveW
Ignatz Waghalter (1881–1949): Der Teufelsweg, Mandragola, Jugend, Sataniel, Ahasaverus and EstherRichard Wagner (1813–1883): Die Feen, Der fliegende Holländer, Die Hochzeit, Das Liebesverbot, Lohengrin, Die Meistersinger von Nürnberg, Parsifal, Rienzi, Der Ring des Nibelungen (Das Rheingold, Die Walküre, Siegfried, Götterdämmerung), Tannhäuser, Tristan und IsoldeSiegfried Wagner (1869–1930): Der BärenhäuterRudolf Wagner-Régeny (1903–1969): Das Bergwerk zu Falun, Die Bürger von Calais, Der Günstling, PrometheusJulian Wagstaff (1970– ): The Turing Test (opera), Breathe Freely (opera)Rufus Wainwright (1973– ): Prima Donna, HadrianIgor Wakhévitch (1948– ): Être DieuStewart Wallace (1960– ): The Bonesetter's DaughterWilliam Vincent Wallace (1812–1865): The Amber Witch, Lurline, Maritana, The Desert FlowerJoelle Wallach (1946– ): The King's Twelve MoonsHermann Wolfgang von Waltershausen (1882–1954): Else Klapperzehen, Oberst Chabert, Richardis, Die Rauhensteiner Hochzeit, Die Gräfin von TolosaWilliam Walton (1902–1983): The Bear, Troilus and CressidaRobert Ward (1917–2013): The CrucibleRoger Waters (1943– ): Ça Ira (opera)Carl Maria von Weber (1786–1826): Abu Hassan, Die drei Pintos, Der Freischütz, Euryanthe, Oberon, Peter Schmoll und seine Nachbarn, SilvanaJoseph Weigl (1766–1846): Die Schweizer FamilieKurt Weill (1900–1950): Die Bürgschaft, Down in the Valley, The Eternal Road (Der Weg der Verheissung), The Firebrand of Florence, Happy End, Der Jasager, Johnny Johnson, Knickerbocker Holiday, Der Kuhhandel (A Kingdom for a Cow, or Arms and the Cow), Lady in the Dark, Lost in the Stars, Love Life, One Touch of Venus, Der Protagonist, Rise and Fall of the City of Mahagonny (Aufstieg und Fall der Stadt Mahagonny), Royal Palace, The Seven Deadly Sins (Die sieben Todesünden), Der Silbersee, Street Scene, The Threepenny Opera (Die Dreigroschenoper), Der Zar lässt sich photographieren, The Flight across the OceanMieczysław Weinberg (1919–1996): The PortraitJaromír Weinberger (1896–1967): Schwanda the Bagpiper, Milovaný hlas (The Beloved Voice), Lidé z Pokerflatu (The Outcasts of Poker Flat), Jarní bouře (Spring Storms), Na růžích ustláno (A Bed of Roses), Apropó, co dělá Andula? (By the Way, What Is Andula Doing?), Císař pán na třešních (The Emperor Lord of Cherries), Valdštejn (Wallenstein)
Felix Weingartner (1863–1942): Genesius, Meister Andrea, SakuntalaJudith Weir (1954– ): Blond Eckbert, Heaven Ablaze in His Breast, King Harald's Saga, A Night at the Chinese Opera, The Vanishing Bridegroom, ArmidaHugo Weisgall (1912–1997): Esther, Nine Rivers from Jordan, Six Characters in Search of an Author, The Stronger, The Tenor, Will You Marry Me?Dan Welcher (1948– ): Della's GiftJohn Weldon (1676–1736): The Judgement of ParisEgon Wellesz (1885–1974): Die Prinzessin Girnara, Die BakchantinnenFelix Werder (1922–2012): AgamemnonPeter Westergaard (1931–2019): The Tempest, Alice in WonderlandGillian Whitehead (1941– ): Outrageous FortuneJörg Widmann (1973– ): Das Gesicht im Spiegel, BabylonCharles-Marie Widor (1844–1937): Maître AmbrosAlec Wilder (1907–1980): The Lowland Sea, Sunday Excursion, The OpeningHealey Willan (1880–1968): DeirdreGrace Williams (1906–1977): The ParlourMalcolm Williamson (1931–2003): English Eccentrics, The Happy Prince, Julius Caesar Jones, Lucky Peter's Journey, Our Man in Havana, The Valley and the Hill, The Violins of Saint-JacquesCharles Wilson (1931–2019): Héloise and Abelard, Psycho RedJames Wilson (1922–2005): Letters to Theo, Grinning at the DevilThomas Wilson (1927–2001): The Charcoal Burner, Confessions of a Justified SinnerHerbert Windt (1894–1965): AndromachePeter Winter (1754–1825): Babylons Pyramiden, Der Bettelstudent, Das Labyrinth, Leonardo und Blandine, Das unterbrochene OpferfestPeter Wishart (1921–1984): Two in the Bush, The CaptiveErling Wold (1958– ): A Little Girl Dreams of Taking the VeilHugo Wolf (1860–1903): Der CorregidorErmanno Wolf-Ferrari (1876–1948): Il campiello, Le donne curiose, I gioielli della Madonna, I quatro rusteghi, Il segreto di Susanna, SlyAlbert Wolff (1884–1970): L'oiseau bleuStefan Wolpe (1902–1972): Zeus und Elida, Schöne GeschichtenPaul Wranitzky (1756–1808): Oberon, König der ElfenCharles Wuorinen (1938–2020): Brokeback Mountain,  Haroun and the Sea of StoriesX
Spyridon Xyndas (1812/1814–1896): Il Conte Giuliano, O ypopsifios vouleftis (The parliamentary candidate), O neogambros, I due pretendentiY
Kosaku Yamada (1886–1965): Kurofune (The Black Ships)
Christopher Yavelow (1950– ): The Passion of Vincent van Gogh, Countdown
Eugène Ysaÿe (1858–1931): Pier li Houyeû
Sergei Yuferov (1865–?): Myrrha (Мирра), Yolande (Иоланда), Antoine et Cléopatre (Антоний и Клеопатра)
Isang Yun (1917–1995): Sim Tjong

Z
Ivan Zajc (1832–1914): Nikola Šubić Zrinjski
Riccardo Zandonai (1883–1944): I cavalieri di Ekebù, Conchita, Francesca da Rimini, Giulietta e Romeo, La farsa amorosa
Carl Zeller (1842–1898): Der Obersteiger, Der Vogelhändler
Alexander von Zemlinsky (1871–1942): Es war einmal, Eine florentinische Tragödie, Der König Kandaules, Der Kreidekreis, Sarema, Der Traumgörge, Der Zwerg
Hans Zender (1936– ): Stephen Climax, Don Quijote de la Mancha
Otakar Zich (1879–1934): Preciézky
Karl Michael Ziehrer (1843–1922): Der Fremdenführer, König Jérôme, Die Landstreicher
Winfried Zillig (1905–1963): Die Windsbraut
Bernd Alois Zimmermann (1918–1970): Die Soldaten
Udo Zimmermann (1943–2021): Levin's Mühle, Der Schuhu und die fliegende Prinzessin, Weiße Rose, Die wundersame Schusterfrau
Niccolò Antonio Zingarelli (1752–1837): Giulietta e Romeo, Ines de Castro, Pirro, re d'Epiro
Heinrich Zöllner (1854–1941): Die versunkene Glocke (The Sunken Bell)
Manuel de Zumaya (1678–1755): Partenope
Johann Rudolf Zumsteeg (1760–1802): Das Pfauenfest

See also
List of important operas
List of operas by title

 
 Composer